"Notice Me" is the first single from freestyle singer Sandeé's debut album Only Time Will Tell.

Track listing
Germany Maxi-single

1994 Remixes

Charts

Cover Version
In 1993, Hong Kong singer Stephanie Che covered this song in Cantonese.

See also
 Nikki (singer)

References

1988 singles
Sandeé songs
1988 songs
Songs written by Robert Clivillés